One Business Bay is a 35-storey skyscraper developed and owned by Omniyat is located on plot 001 at the northern Sheikh Zayed Road entrance of Business Bay, Dubai, United Arab Emirates. The building was designed by German architects Kling Consult GmbH. The tower has 3 basement floors and a five-floor podium with 1000 car park spaces.

Each floor will be larger than the previous. It will have 774 m² on its 1st floor and 1,420 m² on its 30th floor.

It was completed in Q3 2009.

See also
 List of buildings in Dubai

References

External links
One Business Bay
Emporis listing

Skyscraper office buildings in Dubai